Operation Barak (Mivtza Barak, lit. Operation Lightning) was a Haganah offensive launched just before the end of the British Mandate in Palestine. It was part of Plan Dalet. Its objective was to capture villages North of Gaza in anticipation of the arrival of the Egyptian army. It was undertaken by the newly formed Giv'ati brigade, commanded by Shimon Avidan.

Background
Operational orders defined the Giv'ati brigades objectives as: "To deny the enemy a base ... creating general panic and breaking his morale ... cause the flight of the inhabitants of the smaller settlements in the area." Commander Avidan's instructions were: "You will determine alone, in consultation with your Arab affair advisers and Intelligence Service officer, the villages in your zone that should be occupied, cleaned up or destroyed." According to historian Benny Morris, Avidan preferred the latter option.As a prelude, the Giv'ati brigade's first action took place on 4 May 1948 when the brigade occupied 'Aqir, south west of al-Ramle, population 2,480.

Operation
The offensive was launched on 9 May with Bayt Daras being subjected to mortar bombardment prior to being occupied. Subsequently, village houses were blown up. A second round of attacks were launched on 15 May.

Aftermath
Two months later the Giv'ati brigade carried out a further operation in this area capturing at least 16 villages and creating 'more than 20,000' refugees.

Communities captured during Operation Barak

See also
 Depopulated Palestinian locations in Israel

References

Bibliography
 Walid Khalidi, All That Remains, . Uses 1945 census for population figures.
 Benny Morris, The Birth of the Palestinian refugee problem, 1947–1949, .

Operation Barak
May 1948 events in Asia